Arthur Edmunds (May 18, 1933 – July 21, 2005) was an American naval architect, credited with designing 29 sailboats as well as other boats of various types and forms. He is recognized as a top naval architect in the US. Edmunds's best known production sailboat was the Allied Princess 36.

Early life
Arthur H. Edmunds Jr. was born in Philadelphia, Pennsylvania on May 18, 1933. He attended the US Coast Guard Academy in New London, Connecticut. He served in the United States Coast Guard and became a lieutenant in September 1962. He became a marine architect and a member of the Society of Naval Architects and Marine Engineers.

Career
After completing his military service, Edmunds worked at a shipyard before joining Chris Craft as a sailing yacht designer before starting his own design firm in 1968 in Ft. Lauderdale, Florida. Edmunds' design firm operated for 30 years. Leon Slikkers, founder of Slikcraft, and later S2 Yachts, hired Edmunds, who became "S2's in-house designer." Edmunds designed S2's sailboats until 1980, and also provided engineering and design contributions to yachts designed by the firm Graham & Schlageter.

Edmunds is the author of several books including Buying a Great Boat and Designing Power & Sail, published March 1, 1998, by Bristol Fashion Publications, Inc. .

Edmunds was known to "prowl boat repair yards" as a learning experience and to aid him in designing better boats.

Designs
Edmunds is credited with designing 29 sailboats as well as motor boats.

Sailboats

Motorboats
Power Tri

Sources
Buying a Great Boat, Bristol Fashion Publications, published 2000. 
Building a Fiberglass Boat, Bristol Fashion Publications, 1999. 
Designing Power and Sail (with Robert Lollo), Bristol Fashion Publications, 1998. 
Fiberglass Boat Survey, Bristol Fashion Publications, 1998.

References

Arthur Edmunds
1933 births
2005 deaths